Allan Charles Mennie (27 April 1935 - 29 December 2018) was an Australian rules footballer who played for the St Kilda Football Club in the Victorian Football League (VFL).

Notes

External links 

2018 deaths
1935 births
Australian rules footballers from Victoria (Australia)
St Kilda Football Club players